84th Brigade may refer to:

 84th Indian Infantry Brigade
 84th Mixed Brigade (Spain)
 84th Brigade (United Kingdom)